A List of Ministers of Finance of Romania:

Before independence (1862–1877)
 Alexandru C. Moruzi – 22 January 1862 – 27 January 1862
 Grigore Balș – 27 January 1862 – 1 March 1862
 Alexandru Catargi – 11 March 1862 – 24 March 1862
 Teodor Ghica – 24 March 1862 – 12 July 1862
 Alexandru Cantacuzino – 12 July 1862 – 30 September 1862
 Alexandru Cantacuzino – 30 September 1862 – 16 March 1863
 Constantin I. Iliescu – 16 March 1863 – 31 July 1863
 Constantin I. Iliescu – 31 July 1863 – 11 October 1863
 Ludovic Steege – 11 October 1863 – 21 January 1865
 Nicolae Rosetti-Bălănescu – 21 January 1865 – 26 January 1865
 Ion Strat – 26 January 1865 – 14 June 1865
 Nicolae Kretzulescu – 14 June 1865 – 30 January 1866
 Ioan Oteteleșanu – 30 January 1866 – 11 February 1866
 Dimitrie A. Sturdza – 11 February 1866 – 16 February 1866
 Petre Mavrogheni – 16 February 1866 – 10 May 1866
 Ion C. Brătianu – 11 May 1866 – 13 July 1866
 Petre Mavrogheni – 15 July 1866 – 21 February 1867
 Alexandru Văsescu – 1 March 1867 – 4 August 1867
 Ludovic Steege – 17 August 1867 – 1 October 1867
 Grigore Arghiropol – 1 October 1867 – 27 October 1867
 Ion C. Brătianu – 27 October 1867 – 13 November 1867
 Ion C. Brătianu – 13 November 1867 – 29 April 1868
 Ion C. Brătianu – 1 May 1868 – 12 August 1868
 Ion C. Brătianu – 12 August 1868 – 16 November 1868
 Alexandru G. Golescu – 16 November 1868 – 27 January 1870
 Ioan A. Cantacuzino – 2 February 1870 – 30 March 1870
 Constantin Grădișteanu – 20 April 1870 – 14 December 1870
 Dimitrie A. Sturdza – 18 December 1870 – 11 March 1871
 Petre Mavrogheni – 11 March 1871 – 7 January 1875
 Gheorghe Grigore Cantacuzino – 7 January 1875 – 30 January 1876
 Ion Strat – 30 January 1876 – 31 March 1876
 Gen. Christian Tell – 4 April 1876 – 26 April 1876
 Ion C. Brătianu – 27 April 1876 – 27 January 1877
 Dimitrie A. Sturdza – 27 January 1877 – 21 February 1877
 Ion C. Brătianu – 21 February 1877 – 20 August 1877
Source:

Independence to World War I (1878–1918)
 Ion Câmpineanu – 20 August 1877 – 23 September 1877
 Ion Câmpineanu – 23 September 1877 – 25 November 1878
 Dimitrie A. Sturdza – 25 November 1878 – 16 February 1880
 Ion C. Brătianu – 16 February 1880 – 25 February 1880
 Ion Câmpineanu – 25 February 1880 – 15 July 1880
 Ion C. Brătianu – 15 July 1880 – 24 October 1880
 Ion C. Brătianu – 24 October 1880 – 5 April 1881
 Col. Nicolae Dabija – 10 April 1881 – 11 April 1881
 Dimitrie A. Sturdza – 11 April 1881 – 8 June 1881
 Ion C. Brătianu – 9 June 1881 – 1 December 1881
 Gheorghe Chițu – 1 December 1881 – 25 January 1882
 Gheorghe Lecca – 25 January 1882 – 30 August 1885
 Constantin Nacu – 13 September 1885 – 16 December 1885
 Constantin Nacu – 16 December 1885 – 1 March 1888
 Dimitrie A. Sturdza – 1 March 1888 – 20 March 1888
 Menelas Ghermani – 23 March 1888 – 26 March 1889
 George D. Vernescu – 29 March 1889 – 3 November 1889
 Menelas Ghermani – 5 November 1889 – 15 February 1891
 George D. Vernescu – 21 February 1891 – 25 November 1891
 Alexandru B. Știrbei – 27 November 1891 – 18 December 1891
 Menelas Ghermani – 18 December 1891 – 3 October 1895
 Gheorghe Cantacuzino-Râfoveanu – 4 October 1895 – 13 March 1897
 Vasile Lascăr – 13 March 1897 – 26 March 1897
 Gheorghe Cantacuzino-Râfoveanu – 31 March 1897 – 1 October 1898
 George D. Pallade – 1 October 1898 – 30 March 1899
 Gen. Gheorghe Manu – 11 April 1899 – 9 January 1900
 Take Ionescu – 9 January 1900 7 July 1900
 Petre P. Carp – 7 July 1900 – 13 February 1901
 George D. Pallade – 14 February 1901 – 9 January 1902
 Dimitrie A. Sturdza – 9 January 1902 – 18 July 1902
 Emil Costinescu – 18 July 1902 – 20 December 1904
 Take Ionescu – 22 December 1904 – 12 March 1907
 Emil Costinescu – 12 March 1907 – 15 December 1910
 Petre P. Carp – 29 December 1910 – 28 March 1912
 Theodor Rosetti – 28 March 1912 – 14 October 1912
 Alexandru Marghiloman – 14 October 1912 – 31 December 1913
 Emil Costinescu – 4 January 1914 – 11 December 1916
 Victor Antonescu – 11 December 1916 – 10 July 1917
 Nicolae Titulescu – 10 July 1917 – 26 January 1918
 Fotin Enescu – 29 January 1918 – 27 February 1918
 Mihail Seulescu – 6 March 1918 – 4 September 1918
 Constantin C. Arion – 4 September 1918 – 24 October 1918
 Fotin Enescu – 24 October 1918 – 29 October 1918
 Oscar Kiriacescu – 29 October 1918 – 12 September 1919
Source:

Interwar era and World War II (1918–1945)
 Gen. Ioan Popescu – 27 September 1919 – 6 October 1919
 Ion Angelescu – 6 October 1919 – 28 November 1919
 Aurel Vlad – 1 December 1919 – 23 February 1920
 Mihai Popovici – 23 February 1920 – 13 March 1920
 Constantin Argetoianu – 13 March 1920 – 13 June 1920
 Nicolae Titulescu – 13 June 1920 – 13 December 1921
 Take Ionescu – 17 December 1921 – 17 January 1922
 Vintilă Brătianu – 19 January 1922 – 27 March 1926
 Ion Lapedatu – 30 March 1926 – 19 March 1927
 Gen. Alexandru Averescu – 19 March 1927 – 4 June 1927
 Barbu Știrbey – 4 June 1927 – 6 June 1927
 Mihai Popovici – 6 June 1927 – 20 June 1927
 Vintilă Brătianu – 22 June 1927 – 3 November 1928
 Mihai Popovici – 10 November 1928 – 15 October 1929
 Iuliu Maniu – 15 October 1929 – 26 October 1929
 Virgil Madgearu – 26 October 1929 – 14 November 1929
 Virgil Madgearu – 14 November 1929 – 7 June 1930
 Ion Răducanu – 7 June 1930 – 8 June 1930
 Mihai Popovici – 13 June 1930 – 8 October 1930
 Mihai Popovici – 10 October 1930 – 4 April 1931
 Constantin Argetoianu – 18 April 1931 – 31 May 1932
 Gheorghe Mironescu – 6 June 1932 – 17 October 1932
 Virgil Madgearu – 20 October 1932 – 12 January 1933
 Virgil Madgearu – 14 January 1933 – 9 November 1933
 Dinu Brătianu – 14 November 1933 – 3 January 1934
 Victor Slăvescu – 5 January 1934 – 1 February 1935
 Victor Antonescu – 1 February 1935 – 29 August 1936
 Mircea Cancicov – 29 August 1936 – 14 November 1937
 Mircea Cancicov – 17 November 1937 – 28 December 1937
 Eugen Savu – 28 December 1937 – 10 February 1938
 Mircea Cancicov – 10 February 1938 – 1 February 1939
 Mitiță Constantinescu – 1 February 1939 – 4 July 1940
 Gheorghe N. Leon – 4 July 1940 – 14 September 1940
 George Cretzianu – 14 September 1940 – 27 January 1941
 Gen. Nicolae N. Stoenescu – 27 January 1941 – 8 April 1942
 Ion C. Marinescu – 8 April 1942 – 25 September 1942
 Alexandru D. Neagu – 25 September 1942 – 1 April 1944
 Gheron Netta – 1 April 1944 – 23 August 1944
 Gen. Gheorghe Potopeanu – 23 August 1944 – 13 October 1944
 Gen. Constantin Sănătescu – 13 October 1944 – 4 November 1944
 Mihail Romniceanu – 4 November 1944 – 28 February 1945
 Dumitru Alimănișteanu – 6 March 1945 – 11 April 1945
 Mircea Duma – 11 April 1945 – 24 August 1945
 Alexandru Alexandrini – 23 August 1945 – 7 November 1947
Source:

Socialist Republic of Romania (1947–1989)
 Vasile Luca – 7 November 1947 – 9 March 1952
 Dumitru Petrescu – 9 March 1952 – 3 October 1955
 Manea Mănescu – 3 October 1955 – 19 March 1957
 Aurel Vijoli – 19 March 1957 – 16 July 1968
 Virgil Pîrvu – 16 July 1968 – 19 August 1969
 Florea Dumitrescu – 19 August 1969 – 7 March 1978
 Paul Niculescu-Mizil – 7 March 1978 – 30 March 1981
 Petre Gigea – 30 March 1981 – 26 August 1986
 Alexandru Babe – 26 August 1986 – 7 December 1987
 Gheorghe Paraschiv – 7 December 1987 – 28 March 1989
 Ion Pățan – 28 March 1989 – 22 December 1989
Source:

Post-communist Romania (1989–present)

Source:

References

Lists of Romanian politicians